Minoriga-ike Dam is an earthfill dam located in Gifu Prefecture in Japan. The dam is used for irrigation. The catchment area of the dam is 0.5 km2. The dam impounds about 4  ha of land when full and can store 35 thousand cubic meters of water. The construction of the dam was completed in 1915.

References

Dams in Gifu Prefecture